A Reason to Live (lit. "Today") is a 2011 South Korean film written and directed by Lee Jeong-hyang. It stars Song Hye-kyo as a director who forgives a teenage boy for killing her fiancé. It premiered at the 2011 Busan International Film Festival, and was released in theaters on October 27, 2011. It received 131,194 admissions.

Plot
Documentary filmmaker Da-hae (Song Hye-kyo) loses her fiancé by a hit and run accident on her birthday. But she forgives the criminal who was a 15-year-old boy based on her belief as a Catholic and signs a petition for him to revoke the juvenile's death penalty. One year later, Da-hae is commissioned by the Catholic Church to make a documentary on the inhumanity of capital punishment. However, her moral convictions and desire to be compassionate are seriously questioned when she finds out that the teenage driver killed a classmate, not long after his reprieve.

Cast
 Song Hye-kyo as Da-hae      
 Nam Ji-hyun as Ji-min
 Song Chang-eui as Ji-suk
 Ki Tae-young as Sang-woo
 Kim Ji-young as young Da-hae 
 Kim Kwak-kyung-hee as Store owner
 Joo In-young as Baby's mother

References

External links
  
  
 
 
 

2011 films
South Korean drama films
2011 drama films
2010s South Korean films
2010s Korean-language films